Pilocrocis buckleyi is a moth in the family Crambidae. It was described by Herbert Druce in 1895. It is found in Ecuador and Peru.

References

Pilocrocis
Moths described in 1895
Moths of South America